The Santa Cruz Syndicate , is a professional mountain bike racing team sponsored by Santa Cruz Bicycles, competing in the World Cup and World Championships, as well as national level events, in the downhill category. The Syndicate was founded in 2006. 

Current rider line-up consists of the reigning UCI Men's DH World Champion - Greg Minnaar, UCI Men's Elite - Laurie Greenland, UCI Women's Elite - Nina Hoffmann, and the reigning UCI Men's Junior DH World Champion - Jackson Goldstone.

History

2006
In the Syndicate's inaugural year, Steve Peat delivered, winning the UCI Mountain Bike World Cup.

2008
2008 was Greg Minnaar's first year with the Syndicate, and he made his mark immediately, winning the UCI Mountain Bike World Cup, beating out Sam Hill and Gee Atherton. 2008 was also Josh Bryceland's first year with the Syndicate, and he won the UCI Junior Downhill World Championships.

2009
2009 was Steve Peat's year, as he won the UCI World Championships, after finishing 2nd four times before. Greg Minnaar finished in second place, which made the Syndicate the best-ranked UCI Downhill team, seconded by Madcatz Factory Team.

2010
2010 saw Minnaar finishing second in the downhill UCI Mountain Bike World Cup, and third in the UCI Mountain Bike & Trials World Championships.

2014
2014 was the year for Josh Bryceland. "Ratboy" won two World Cup races, and also won the overall DH UCI Mountain Bike World Cup, along with being the British DH National Champion.

2017
In his first season riding a 29-inch-wheeled bike, Greg Minnaar was within striking distance of the UCI Mountain Bike World Cup overall title until a disqualification in Mont Sainte-Anne and a mechanical in the final round in Val di Sole dropped him to third place; Loris Vergier joined him in the top five overall with a fifth-place finish.

Palmarès

2006 
1st  DH, UCI Mountain Bike World Cup, Round 3, Willingen, Germany - Steve Peat
1st  DH, UCI Mountain Bike World Cup, Series Overall - Steve Peat

2008
 1st  DH, British National Mountain Biking Championships - Steve Peat
 1st  DH, British National Mountain Biking Championships Junior - Josh Bryceland
 2nd DH, UCI Mountain Bike World Cup, Round 1, Maribor, Slovenia - Steve Peat
 3rd DH, UCI Mountain Bike World Cup, Round 2, Vallnord, Andorra - Greg Minnaar
 1st  DH, UCI Mountain Bike World Cup, Round 3, Fort William, Scotland -  Greg Minnaar
 3rd DH, UCI Mountain Bike World Cup, Round 3, FortWilliam, Scotland -  Steve Peat
 1st  DH, UCI Mountain Bike World Cup, Round 4, Mont-Sainte-Anne, Canada -  Greg Minnaar
 2nd DH, UCI Mountain Bike World Cup, Round 5, Bromont, Canada -  Greg Minnaar
 3rd DH, UCI Mountain Bike World Cup, Round 5, Bromont, Canada -  Steve Peat
 1st  DH, UCI Mountain Bike World Cup, Round 6, Canberra, Australia -  Greg Minnaar
 1st  DH, UCI Mountain Bike & Trials World Championships Junior, Livigno, Italy - Josh Bryceland
 1st  DH, UCI Mountain Bike World Cup, Series Overall -  Greg Minnaar

2009
 1st  DH, UCI Mountain Bike World Cup, Round 1, Pietermaritzburg, South Africa -  Greg Minnaar
 3rd DH, UCI Mountain Bike World Cup, Round 2, Pietermaritzburg, South Africa - Steve Peat
 1st  DH, UCI Mountain Bike World Cup, Round 2, La Bresse, France -  Steve Peat
 1st  DH, UCI Mountain Bike World Cup, Round 3, Vallnord, Andorra -  Steve Peat
 3rd DH, UCI Mountain Bike World Cup, Round 3, Vallnord, Andorra - Greg Minnaar
 1st DH, UCI Mountain Bike World Cup, Round 1, Maribor, Slovenia - Greg Minnaar
 1st DH, UCI Mountain Bike World Cup, Round 3, Leogang, Austria - Greg Minnaar
 2nd DH, UCI Mountain Bike World Cup, Round 5, Val Di Sole, Italy - Greg Minnaar
 2nd DH, UCI Mountain Bike World Cup, Round 6, Windham, United States - Greg Minnaar

2010
2nd DH, UCI Mountain Bike World Cup, Series Overall - Greg Minnaar
3rd DH, UCI Mountain Bike & Trials World Championships, Mont-Sainte-Anne, Canada - Greg Minnaar

2011
1st  DH, British National Mountain Biking Rd.3 - Josh Bryceland
2nd DH, UCI Mountain Bike World Cup, Mont Saint Anne, Canada - Josh Bryceland
2nd DH, UCI Mountain Bike World Cup, Pietermaritzburg, South Africa - Greg Minnaar
1st DH, UCI Mountain Bike World Cup, Fort William, Scotland - Greg Minnaar
1st DH, UCI Mountain Bike World Cup, La Bresse, France - Greg Minnaar

2012
1st  DH, UCI Mountain Bike World Cup, Pietermaritzburg, South Africa - Greg Minnaar
1st  DH, UCI Mountain Bike & Trials World Championships, Leogang, Austria - Greg Minnaar

2013
1st  DH, UCI Mountain Bike & Trials World Championships, Pietermaritzburg, South Africa - Greg Minnaar
3rd DH, UCI Mountain Bike World Cup, Series Overall - Greg Minnaar

2014
1st  South Africa National DH Championships Pietermaritzburg, South Africa -  Greg Minnaar
3rd DH, UCI Mountain Bike World Cup, Round 1, Pietermaritzburg, South Africa - Greg Minnaar
2nd DH, UCI Mountain Bike World Cup, Round 4, Leogang, Austria - Greg Minnaar 
2nd DH, UCI Mountain Bike World Cup, Round 2, Cairns, Australia - Josh Bryceland 
1st DH, UCI Mountain Bike World Cup, Round 4, Leogang, Austria - Josh Bryceland 
2nd DH, UCI Mountain Bike World Cup, Round 5, Mont Saint Anne, Canada - Josh Bryceland
1st  DH, UCI Mountain Bike World Cup, Round 6, Windham, United States - Josh Bryceland
1st British National Mountain Biking Championships - Josh Bryceland
3rd DH, UCI Mountain Bike World Cup, Round 7, Meribel, France - Josh Bryceland
1st  DH, UCI Mountain Bike World Cup Overall  - Josh Bryceland
2nd DH, UCI Mountain Bike & Trials World Championships, Hafjell, Norway - Josh Bryceland

2008-2016 Team roster

2017-2020 Team roster

2021 team roster

References

External links 
Santa Cruz Syndicate - official site

Mountain biking teams and clubs
Cycling teams established in 2006
Cycling teams based in the United States
Downhill mountain bikers